The Trespasser is a 1912 novel by D. H. Lawrence. Set mostly on the Isle of Wight, it tells the story of Siegmund, a married man with children, and his adulterous affair with Helena.

Originally it was titled the Saga of Siegmund and drew upon the experiences of a friend of Lawrence, Helen Corke, and her adulterous relationship with a married man that ended with his suicide.  Lawrence worked from Corke's diary, with her permission, but also urged her to publish; which she did in 1933 as Neutral Ground.

Reception 
The biographer Brenda Maddox writes in D. H. Lawrence: The Story of a Marriage (1994) that The Trespasser was reviewed by the translator Constance Garnett, who found its last fifty pages comparable in quality to the work of "the best Russian school."

Standard edition 
 The Trespasser (1912), edited by Elizabeth Mansfield, Cambridge University Press, 1981,

References

External links 
 
 

Novels by D. H. Lawrence
Novels set on islands
1912 British novels
Gerald Duckworth and Company books